Walker Peak is a sharp peak in Antarctica, 1,495 m, marking the southwest extremity of Dufek Massif, Pensacola Mountains. It was mapped by the United States Geological Survey (USGS) from surveys and U.S. Navy air photos from 1956 to 1966. It was named by the Advisory Committee on Antarctic Names (US-ACAN) for Paul T. Walker, a glaciologist at Ellsworth Station and a member of the first party to visit Dufek Massif in December 1957.

Mountains of Queen Elizabeth Land
Pensacola Mountains